Gabriel Ortiz de Orbé (1600–1661) was a Roman Catholic prelate who served as Bishop of Gaeta (1651–1661).

Biography
Gabriel Ortiz de Orbé was born in 1600 in Castello Mendieta, Spain.
On 28 Oct 1651, he was appointed during the papacy of Pope Innocent X as Bishop of Gaeta.
On 5 Nov 1651, he was consecrated bishop by Marcantonio Franciotti, Cardinal-Priest of Santa Maria della Pace, with Giambattista Spada, Titular Patriarch of Constantinople, and Girolamo Buonvisi, Titular Archbishop of Laodicea in Phrygia, serving as co-consecrators. 
He served as Bishop of Gaeta until his death in 1661.

References

External links and additional sources
 (for Chronology of Bishops) 
 (for Chronology of Bishops) 

17th-century Italian Roman Catholic bishops
Bishops appointed by Pope Innocent X
1600 births
1661 deaths